José Carvalho Sério (born 5 March 1922 – 3 December 2010) was a Portuguese footballer who played as goalkeeper. He was born in Lisbon, Portugal.

Football career 
Sério gained 1 cap for Portugal against Spain 21 March 1948 in Madrid, in a 0–2 defeat.

References

External links 
 
 

1922 births
Portuguese footballers
Association football goalkeepers
Primeira Liga players
C.F. Os Belenenses players
Portugal international footballers
Year of death missing
Footballers from Lisbon